Otter Lake Airport  was located  south of Missinipe, Saskatchewan, Canada.

See also 
 Otter Lake Water Aerodrome
 List of airports in Saskatchewan
 List of defunct airports in Canada

References 

Defunct airports in Saskatchewan